Sabine Hauswirth (born 8 December 1987) is a Swiss orienteering competitor.

She won a gold medal in the relay in the 2014 World Orienteering Championships in Asiago-Lavarone with the Swiss team, and placed 14th in the middle distance.

In 2017, she ranked third at  The World Games 2017 in Wroclaw, Poland in the middle-distance and second in the mixed sprint relay.

As a junior, she won a bronze medal in the relay at the 2007 Junior World Championships in Dubbo, where she also placed fourth in the long course.

References

External links

1987 births
Living people
Swiss orienteers
Female orienteers
Foot orienteers
World Orienteering Championships medalists
World Games silver medalists
World Games bronze medalists
Competitors at the 2017 World Games
Junior World Orienteering Championships medalists